Phrynichidae is a family of arachnids.

Distribution
The species of this family are found in Africa, South Asia and South America.

Genera
 Damoninae Simon, in Fage & Simon 1936
 Damon C. L. Koch, 1850
 Musicodamon Fage, 1939
 Phrynichodamon Weygoldt, 1996
 Phrynichinae Simon, 1892
 Euphrynichus Weygoldt, 1995
 Phrynichus Karsch, 1879
 Trichodamon Mello-Leitao, 1935
 indefinite subfamily
 Xerophrynus Weygoldt, 1996

References

Simon, 1892 : Arachnides. Etude sur les Arthropodes cavernicoles de île Luzon, Voyage de M. E. Simon aux îles Philippines (Mars et avril 1890), Annales de la Société Entomologique de France, vol. 61, p. 35–52.
Harvey, Mark S. 2003-01-01. Catalogue of the Smaller Arachnid Orders of the World: Amblypygi, Uropygi, Schizomida, Palpigradi, Ricinulei and Solifugae. CSIRO Publishing. Collingwood, Victoria, Australia. xi + 400. 0-643-06805-8.

Amblypygi
Arachnid families